The Rome Lions are a lacrosse team based in Rome, Italy. The Lions are the first lacrosse team in Italy, along with the La Spezia Black Eagles. They are a member of the Rome Lacrosse Club which is run by Fabio Antonelli, the former president of the Italian Lacrosse Federation.

References

External links
Rome Lions Official Website 

Sports clubs in Rome
Lacrosse teams in Europe
Lacrosse in Italy
Sports teams in Italy